The British Crown dependency of Jersey was represented in the 2006 Commonwealth Games in Melbourne by a 35-member contingent, comprising 35 sportspersons and no officials.  They competed in 7 sports, including athletics, badminton, cycling, lawn bowls, shooting, swimming, and triathlon.  They won no medals.

Medals

Jersey's Commonwealth Games Team 2006

Athletics

 Simon Phelan – High Jump
 Lauren Therin – Javelin and Discus

Badminton

 Lucy Jane Burns – Doubles/Mixed
 Elizabeth Cann – Singles
 Gavin Carter – singles, Doubles
 Clive Dunford – singles, doubles, Mixed
 Solenn Pasturel – Singles & Doubles

Cycling

 Sam Firby – Time Trial & Road Race

Lawn bowls

 Katrina Bisson – singles
 Derek Boswell – pairs
 Suzanne Dingle – pairs
 Christine Grimes – triples
 Gina De Long – triples
 John James Lowery
 Angus McKinnon – singles
 Lee Nixon
 Gean O'Neil – triples
 Allan Quemard
 Alan Shaw – triples
 Gaynor Thomaa – pairs

Shooting

 Richard Benest
 Kevin De Gruchy
 Marcus Hill
 Stephen Le Couillard
 David Le Quesne
 David Jonathan Turner
 David Leslie Ward

Swimming

 Liam Edward Du Feu – 100 m freestyle, 200 m freestyle
 Daniel Halksworth – 200 m IM, 400 m IM
 Simon Le Couillard – 50 m, 100 m, 200 m fly
 Alexis Patrick Militis – 100 m 50 m freestyle

Triathlon

 Paul Clements
 Scott Pitcher
 Timothy Rogers

References
Jersey Commonwealth Games Association website

Jersey at the Commonwealth Games
Nations at the 2006 Commonwealth Games
Commonwealth Games